The 1982–83 Northern Counties East Football League season was the first in the history of Northern Counties East Football League, a football competition in England. The league was formed by the merger of the Midland League and the Yorkshire League.

Premier Division

The Premier Division featured 20 clubs, joined from the Midland League and the Yorkshire League.
Clubs joined from the Midland League:
Alfreton Town
Appleby Frodingham
Arnold
Belper Town
Boston
Bridlington Trinity
Eastwood Town
Guisborough Town
Heanor Town
Ilkeston Town
Mexborough Town Athletic
Shepshed Charterhouse
Skegness Town
Spalding United
Sutton Town
Clubs joined from the Yorkshire League:
Bentley Victoria Welfare
Emley
Guiseley
Thackley
Winterton Rangers

League table

Map

Division One North

Division One North was formed by the Yorkshire League clubs.
Clubs joined from the Yorkshire League Division One:
Farsley Celtic
Leeds Ashley Road
Liversedge
North Ferriby United
Ossett Albion
Scarborough reserves
York Railway Institute

Clubs joined from the Yorkshire League Division Two:
Bradley Rangers
Bridlington Town
Garforth Miners
Hall Road Rangers
Harrogate Town
Hatfield Main
Ossett Town

League table

Map

Division One South

Division featured 14 clubs, joined from the Midland League and the Yorkshire League.
Clubs joined from the Midland League Premier Division:
Brigg Town
Long Eaton United
Clubs joined from the Midland League Division One:
Arnold Kingswell
Kimberley Town
Staveley Works
Clubs joined from the Yorkshire League Division One:
Frecheville Community
Hallam
Lincoln United
Sheffield
Clubs joined from the Yorkshire League Division Two:
BSC Parkgate
Harworth Colliery Institute
Maltby Miners Welfare
Norton Woodseats
Club joined from the Yorkshire League Division Three:
Denaby United

League table

Map

Division Two North

Division featured 14 clubs, joined from the Yorkshire League and the York League.
Clubs joined from the Yorkshire League Division Two:
Fryston Colliery Welfare
Grimethorpe Miners Welfare
Pilkington Recreation
Yorkshire Amateur
Clubs joined from the Yorkshire League Division Three:
Brook Sports
Collingham
Harrogate Railway Athletic
Phoenix Park
Pickering Town
Pontefract Collieries
Selby Town
Tadcaster Albion
Thorne Colliery
Club joined from the York Football League
Rowntree Mackintosh

League table

Map

Division Two South

Division featured 14 clubs, joined from the Midland League and the Yorkshire League.
Clubs joined from the Midland League Division One:
Borrowash Victoria
Creswell Colliery
Folk House Old Boys, who also changed name to Blidworth Miners Welfare
Graham Street Prims
Long Eaton Grange
Oakham United
Retford Rail
Rolls Royce (Hucknall)
Sutton Trinity
Club joined from the Yorkshire League Division Two:
Kiveton Park
Clubs joined from the Yorkshire League Division Three:
Stocksbridge Works
Wombwell Sporting Association
Woolley Miners Welfare
Worsbrough Bridge Miners Welfare

League table

Map

References

1982-83
8